Port Pirie railway station (Mary Elie Street) was the fifth of six stations that operated at various times from 1876 to serve the small maritime town (later city) of Port Pirie,   by rail north of Adelaide, South Australia. As with several of Port Pirie's other stations before it, the station was built to accommodate a change of track gauge on railway lines leading into the town.

In 1966, planning commenced for the long-overdue conversion to  standard gauge of the South Australian Railways  narrow gauge line from Port Pirie to the New South Wales border. This project was to culminate in 1970, when for the first time trains were able to travel the entire Sydney–Perth rail corridor without a change of gauge.

At Port Pirie, new standard-gauge sidings and other facilities would be needed to handle the increased freight and passenger traffic enabled by the upgraded line. At that time the town had three passenger stations:
The first was the 1908-vintage Ellen Street station, on ground level at the end of a dual-gauge (broad and narrow) track that ran down the town's main street; it had become increasingly unpopular on account of congestion and safety concerns. It would close once the new line had been constructed, and would be re-purposed under new ownership.
The second was Port Pirie Junction station, opened in 1937 to accommodate transfers between a new broad-gauge line to Redhill (thence Adelaide) and a new standard-gauge line to Port Augusta (thence Western Australia). Since its island platform would be far too short for the new Indian Pacific, it would be demolished.
The third was the small, 1911-vintage Solomontown railway station. With ground-level boarding, it sat alongside the Port Pirie Junction station, its two tracks next to the junction station's two broad gauge tracks. The line it served, the 1878-vintage narrow-gauge route inland to Gladstone and beyond, carried ore trains from Broken Hill, and a railcar ran a service mainly for schoolchildren in the morning and afternoon – the remnant of more frequent services that existed when the railway was the principal means of transport. A broad-gauge track would be laid to take trains from Adelaide to the new station.

Although space was limited in Port Pirie's rail yards, standard-gauge and broad-gauge track would replace the narrow-gauge sidings (in new configurations) at Port Pirie South yard. Passengers, parcels and mail would transfer across a new island platform paralleling Wandearah Road; the station entrance would front Mary Elie Street. As before, broad-gauge trains came from Adelaide, to the south, and standard-gauge trains from Port Augusta, to the north; the new element was standard-gauge trains from Broken Hill, to the east.

The configuration of tracks and platform was not easily devised – the South Australian Railways insisted that all freight and passenger traffic from the rail corridor would enter the Port Pirie yard and station. Since there was no room for track to continue on at the northern end, the station would have to be a stub terminal, and without the capacity that would allow passengers to join or leave at the middle or either end of the train, a platform capable of holding an entire passenger train was necessary. The Indian Pacific, on its cross-continent  journey due to commence in January 1970, would be much longer than the trains operating before then, namely the Trans-Australian to Western Australia, other standard-gauge services to Whyalla and Woomera, and the East–west Express and other trains to Adelaide.

The new station, from which trains started to run on 12 November 1967, was well received by the town populace; Port Pirie Town Council had been advocating a terminal station there for more than 25 years.

Facilities constructed at the station included a waiting room, a refreshment room, a resthouse for train crew, a locomotive stabling depot, diesel fuelling, passenger car water supply, and a turntable. As had occurred at Port Pirie Junction station, a run-around loop on each side permitted locomotives to be detached and turned, and a shunting locomotive took the carriages away to be placed in the sequence needed for the return journey. The Indian Pacific, which first arrived in Port Pirie on 24 February 1970, was the exception: since Port Pirie was only a pause in its journey, its carriages did not need to be rearranged. Much longer operating delays occurred with freight traffic, not only because of the dead-end configuration of the tracks but also because broad-gauge and standard-gauge bogies had to be exchanged on all freight cars that travelled between the South Australian Railways and Commonwealth Railways. A 1971 report stated: "It is expected that in the near future the Australian National Railways Commission will construct a by-pass line around the Port Pirie yard and station to facilitate the fast through movement of freight trains between Sydney and Perth."

In the event, the by-pass line was not laid around the Port Pirie's rail yards and station but on the mainline, where tracks forked out from the yards' exit: north to Port Augusta and south to Crystal Brook, the latter standardised in 1970. By then, the Australian National Railways Commission had acquired the South Australian Railways and Commonwealth Railways, so locomotives did not have to be changed at Mary Elie Street when going to and from what had previously been separate systems. The Indian Pacific, however, did not bypass the station until 1986.

Mary Elie Street station closed on 5 February 1989. It was still considered necessary to provide a facility for Port Pirie passengers of The Ghan, Indian Pacific, and (until June 1991, when it ceased) the Trans-Australian, so a tiny "provisional" stop was simultaneously re-established at Coonamia (see map, station 6), allowing trains to pick up and drop off Port Pirie passengers without having to go through the reversing procedure.

Nine months later, the federal House of Representatives Standing Committee on Transport, Communications and Infrastructure recommended that the Indian Pacific and Trans-Australian, which still ran over three different rail authorities' tracks, be booked, staffed and controlled by Australian National and be upgraded, refurbished and marketed as luxury train journeys. Further, "Intra-state passengers should only be carried on a stand-by basis, and should rely on alternatives for their primary transport requirements". Australian National acted quickly to discontinue South Australian non-metropolitan intrastate train services, which it achieved in December 1989. Since it served interstate trains, Coonamia remained in use until the 2010s, although climbing down over the ballast shoulder and down to ground level was a difficult, undignified travel experience for the few people who persisted in travelling on a long-distance train within their state.

In 1990, tracks to, and at, the Mary Elie Street platform were lifted. Redevelopment of the northern (ticket office) end as the Port Pirie's tourist information centre, arts centre and public library was completed in 2009. Until 2012, a former Commonwealth Railways GM class locomotive and three 1950s-era passenger cars  were stabled at the platform as a public display; one car was a restaurant providing on-the-job training for young people in the hospitality industry with the support of Port Pirie Regional Council and The Foundation for Young Australians.

As of 2021, the platform, its canopy and the block formerly used as a waiting room remained. A miniature railway operated in the garden surrounds. The forecourt served as a bus station.

Preceding stations: Ellen Street, Port Pirie Junction, and Solomontown.

Concurrent station: none.

Subsequent station: Coonamia provisional stopping place.

Notes

References

External links
Photos of Mary Elie Street station, 2009, on Flickr (  registration: a free registration is required to access the source.)
Diagram of Mary Elie Street and Port Pirie South yard track layout, 1970–1982 (p. 29, map 1015) 
Diagram of Port Pirie track layout, 2019

Disused railway stations in South Australia
Railway stations in Australia opened in 1967
Port Pirie
Commonwealth Railways